Anders Christensen Arrebo (2 January 1587 in Ærøskøbing – 12 March 1637) was a Danish poet and Lutheran bishop. He was appointed bishop to the Diocese of Trondhjem in 1618, but had to leave office in 1622. His main contribution to literature is the poem Hexaëmeron.

References

1587 births
1637 deaths
Danish male poets
17th-century Danish writers
Danish Lutheran bishops
Bishops of Nidaros
17th-century Norwegian clergy
People from Ærø Municipality
17th-century male writers